Svetoslav Dyakov (born 31 May 1984) is a Bulgarian professional retired footballer who played as a midfielder. He was the club captain of Ludogorets Razgrad and, between 2015 and 2017, was the captain of the national team as well.

Career
Born in Blagoevgrad, Dyakov began his football career with a local club, Pirin. In 2005, he signed with Pirin 1922.

Lokomotiv Sofia
On 18 June 2008, Dyakov became Lokomotiv Sofia's first summer signing. He signed a three-year contract. He made his debut on 9 August 2008, in a 1–0 away win over Minyor Pernik. Dyakov made a further 24 league appearances in the 2008–09 season without scoring.

His first goal came in a 3–0 home win against Sliven 2000 on 6 November 2010. During his three years at Lokomotiv, Dyakov made 79 appearances, scoring two goals.

Ludogorets Razgrad

After his contract with Lokomotiv expired, Dyakov joined Ludogorets Razgrad on a free transfer. He signed a two-year contract on 4 June 2011. Dyakov made his league debut against Lokomotiv Plovdiv in a 0–0 home draw on 6 August. He enjoyed a successful first season at Ludogorets and quickly established himself as a first team regular. On 19 May 2012, Dyakov scored his first goal as a Ludogorets player in the team's league match against Kaliakra Kavarna after scoring a penalty. Ludogorets won the match 4–0. In his first season with Ludogorets, Dyakov collected his first A Group title winner's medal. He also won for first time in his career Bulgarian Cup and Bulgarian Supercup.

On 18 June 2013, Dyakov was appointed the club captain of Ludogorets for the 2013–14 season. He scored his first-ever European goal on 3 October, in a 3–0 home win over Dinamo Zagreb in the group stage of Europa League. On 19 December, he was named the best midfielder of the year in Bulgaria. On 4 October 2018, Dyakov was in the starting line-up for Ludogorets in a 1–0 away loss against FC Zürich in the group stage of the UEFA Europa League and together with teammate Cosmin Moți became the player with the joint most appearances for (a) Bulgarian team(s) in European club tournaments, alongside Hristo Yovov whose record of 66 matches they equaled. He has (as of 14 April 2020) made 79 appearances (78 in the colors of Ludogorets and one as a footballer of Lokomotiv Sofia), trailing teammate Marcelinho who has 80 (all for Ludogorets). In May 2020, Dyakov extended his contract with the team.

On 19 May 2021, Ludogorets announced that Dyakov would leave the club after almost ten years of service, offering him a position in the club administrative, but Dyakov showed a desire to play for one more season at another club, before retiring and joining Ludogorets' technical body.

Return to Pirin
In May 2021, Dyakov announced that he would join Pirin, the team where he started his career, which had just gotten promoted to the First League. He officially retired on 21 May 2022, when he played his last match against Botev Vratsa, when he was substituted in the 18th minute, his playing number for the most of his career.

International career
On 14 February 2012, Dyakov was called up to the Bulgaria squad, for their friendly fixture against Hungary. Two weeks later, he marked his international début at the age of 27, with an assist to a Valeri Bojinov goal in the 1–1 draw at ETO Park. On 11 September 2012, Dyakov was sent off for a second yellow card in a 2014 World Cup qualifier against Armenia that was won 1–0 by Bulgaria. On 11 October 2013, he received a red card after being cautioned twice against the same opponent – Bulgaria lost the match held in Yerevan 2–1. On 7 February 2015, Dyakov captained his country in the 0–0 draw with Romania in a non-official friendly match, as Ivelin Popov and Nikolay Bodurov were absent from the team.

Personal life
Dyakov is also enrolled as a student at the South-West University, where he is pursuing coaching studies.

Career statistics

Club

International

Honours 
Ludogorets
 Bulgarian League (10): 2011–12, 2012–13, 2013–14, 2014–15, 2015–16, 2016–17, 2017–18, 2018–19, 2019–20, 2020–21
 Bulgarian Cup: 2011–12, 2013–14
 Bulgarian Supercup: 2012, 2014, 2018, 2019

Individual
 Best midfielder in the league: 2013, 2014
 Bulgarian Footballer of the Year: second place 2014, 2016; third place 2013
 Razgrad Sportsman of the year: 2014

References

External links
 

1984 births
Living people
Sportspeople from Blagoevgrad
Bulgarian footballers
Bulgaria international footballers
Bulgaria under-21 international footballers
Association football midfielders
First Professional Football League (Bulgaria) players
OFC Pirin Blagoevgrad players
PFC Pirin Blagoevgrad players
FC Lokomotiv 1929 Sofia players
PFC Ludogorets Razgrad players
PFC Ludogorets Razgrad II players